Marepe may refer to:
Marepe (artist) (born 1970), Brazilian contemporary artist
Marepe (place), a peak in the northern Drakensberg, South Africa